Bétou is a town on the right bank of the Ubangi River in the Likouala Department, Republic of the Congo. Bétou is a "sous-prefecture" and has its own mayor. The town is linked to Bangui, the capital of CAR, by a relatively good road but suffers from very poor road access to the south of the Republic of Congo, with the vast majority of travelers arriving by river. The town has a disused air-strip .

The town is dominated by a large Italian-run timber factory which is the area's major employer.

Since late 2009, according to the UNHCR, the district of Bétou accommodates around 57,000 refugees who have fled the Dongo conflict in the Équateur Province of the Democratic Republic of the Congo (directly opposite across the Ubangi River), of whom just over 10,000 live in the town of Bétou, with the rest spread throughout small riverside villages. International organisations have established field bases in Bétou to assist the refugees (Médecins Sans Frontières, UNHCR, ACTED).

Likouala Department
Populated places in the Republic of the Congo
Ubangi River